Yttrium(III) antimonide (YSb) is an inorganic chemical compound.

References

Antimonides
Yttrium compounds
Rock salt crystal structure